The Four Pawns Attack can refer to a variety of different chess openings, including:

 King's Indian Defence, Four Pawns Attack
 the Four Pawns Attack in Alekhine's Defence
 the Four Pawns Attack in the Modern Benoni

Chess openings